is a Japanese anime film director at Madhouse. He was born on December 5, 1973, and has been with Madhouse since 1999. Masuhara started at the company as an episode director, before directing the short film Clamp in Wonderland 2 in 2007 and becoming a full series director on Chi's Sweet Home in 2008.

Filmography

TV series
Chi's Sweet Home (2008) - Director
Chi's Sweet Home: Chi's New Address (2009) - Director
Kobato (2009-2010) - Director
Blade (2011) - Director
Shirokuma Cafe (2012) - Director
Ace of Diamond (2013-2016) - Director
Okko's Inn (2018) - Director
Ace of Diamond Act II (2019-) - Director

OVAs
Clamp in Wonderland 2 (2007) - Director

References

External links

Japanese animated film directors
Anime directors
1973 births
People from Kariya, Aichi
Japanese animators
Living people
Madhouse (company) people